William Sutton VC (1830 – 16 February 1888) was an English recipient of the Victoria Cross, the highest and most prestigious award for gallantry in the face of the enemy that can be awarded to British and Commonwealth forces.

Details
Sutton was about 27 years old, and a bugler in the 1st Battalion, 60th Rifles (later The King's Royal Rifle Corps), British Army during the Indian Mutiny when the following deed took place on 13 September 1857 at Delhi, India for which he was awarded the Victoria Cross.

There is a plaque in his memory in St Peter's Church, Ightham, where he is buried in an unmarked grave.

The medal
His Victoria Cross is displayed at the Royal Green Jackets (Rifles) Museum, Winchester, England.

References

Monuments to Courage (David Harvey, 1999)
The Register of the Victoria Cross (This England, 1997)

External links
Location of grave and VC medal (Kent)

1830 births
1888 deaths
People from Ightham
King's Royal Rifle Corps soldiers
British recipients of the Victoria Cross
Indian Rebellion of 1857 recipients of the Victoria Cross
British military musicians
British Army recipients of the Victoria Cross
Military personnel from Kent